Chapmanville Regional High School is West Virginia's first cross-county consolidated high school, combining students from Chapmanville High School in Logan County with students from Harts High School in Lincoln County. CRHS is located in Chapmanville. It is operated by Logan County Schools, but funded by both counties. The school hosts roughly 600 students in a given academic year.

Since the merger, CRHS has enjoyed success in football, baseball, and basketball and is a member of the West Virginia Class AA sports division.

The CRHS baseball team went 35-3 and won the Class AA state championship in 2011 marking it the first state championship as Chapmanville Regional High School.

On March 17, 2018, the CRHS boys basketball team defeated the Polar Bears of Fairmont Senior High School by a score of 69 to 60 to take home their first ever state championship. 

On March 16, 2019, The CRHS boys basketball team repeated as WV Class AA State Champs by defeating the Fairmont Senior High School Polar Bears 60-46.

Notable alumni 

 Earl Ray Tomblin, Former Governor of West Virginia
 Obinna Anochili-Killen, Marshall University Basketball Player

References

External links
Chapmanville Regional High School

Public high schools in West Virginia
Schools in Logan County, West Virginia